Michelle Luciano is a Reader in the School of Philosophy, Psychology and Language Sciences at the University of Edinburgh. Her research focuses on the use of twin studies to estimate genetic and environmental contributions to human behavior.She has conducted research on the relationship between Mediterranean diet and brain volume. She was awarded the Visiting Professor Award to visit Trinity College Dublin in June 2019. She was a lead researcher in a study which identified 42 genetic variants associated with dyslexia and that the genetic risk was similar between sexes, this project was in collaboration with researchers from Max Planck Institute for Psycholinguistics, QIMR Berghofer Medical Research Institute, and 23andMe .

References

External links
Faculty page

Living people
Scottish women psychologists
James Cook University alumni
University of Queensland alumni
Academics of the University of Edinburgh
Behavior geneticists
Scottish women academics
Scottish psychologists
Year of birth missing (living people)